The Hon. Wenman Clarence Walpole Coke (13 July 1828 – 10 January 1907) was a British soldier and Liberal Member of Parliament.

Background
Coke was the fourth son of the agricultural reformer Thomas Coke, 1st Earl of Leicester ("Coke of Norfolk"), by his second wife Lady Anne Emilia, daughter of William Keppel, 4th Earl of Albemarle.

Military and political career
Coke was a lieutenant-colonel in the Scots Guards and fought in the Crimean War. In 1858 he was returned to Parliament as one of two representatives for Norfolk East, a seat he held until 1865.

Personal life
Coke made a single appearance in first-class cricket for the Marylebone Cricket Club in 1851. He died unmarried in January 1907, aged 78.

References

External links 
 

1828 births
1907 deaths
Younger sons of earls
Liberal Party (UK) MPs for English constituencies
UK MPs 1857–1859
UK MPs 1859–1865
Scots Guards officers
British Army personnel of the Crimean War
English cricketers
Marylebone Cricket Club cricketers